Ezkaton is the sixth EP by Polish extreme metal band Behemoth. It was released in North America through Metal Blade Records on 11 November 2008, and in Europe through Regain Records on 20 November 2008. The EP features seven tracks, including one new song titled "Qadosh", a live recording and new studio version to "Chant for Ezkaton 2000 e.v.", live versions of "From the Pagan Vastlands" and "Decade ov Therion", along with covers of Master's Hammer's "Jáma pekel" (lead vocal BigBoss-Root) and Ramones' "I'm Not Jesus".

The first four tracks were recorded during The Apostasy studio sessions at the Radio Gdańsk Studios from November 2006 till March 2007. The other three live tracks were recorded in Leeuwarden, The Netherlands in October 2007 the during the European Apostasy tour.

Ezkaton has also been released as a limited edition box set, that includes four 7-inch picture discs. The set also comes with a bonus track, "Devilock" (Misfits cover) on the third picture disc. Each picture disc has one track on each side.

In 2014, the EP (including the "Devilock" bonus track and several live tracks) was included in a re-release of The Apostasy by Peaceville Records.

The limited edition box set also has two manufacturing mistakes: the CD title for track 3 "Jamal Pekel" is written as "Jamal Piekiel". And the back of the box misses the "live" mention for "Decade Ov Therion".

Track listing
Regular CD and digipak

Personnel

Release history

Chart performance

References

2008 EPs
Behemoth (band) EPs
Metal Blade Records EPs
Regain Records EPs
Mystic Production albums
Albums produced by Adam Darski